The 2022 Nigerian elections will be held throughout 2022. During the year, the governors of Ekiti and Osun states will be elected on 18 June and 16 July, respectively. Additionally, there will also be elections to fill vacant seats in the House of Representatives and state houses of assembly along with local elections in Adamawa State, Benue State, Edo State, Enugu State, the Federal Capital Territory, Imo State, Katsina State, and Kebbi State.

Federal elections

National Assembly elections

House of Representatives elections

At least three by-elections will be held in 2022 to fill vacancies in the House of Representatives:

State elections

Gubernatorial elections

House of Assembly elections

At least six by-elections will be held in 2022 to fill vacancies in state houses of assembly in at least six different states:
 Cross River State
 Akpabuyo State Constituency: On 26 October 2021, member for Akpabuyo Adedayo Omolafe (PDP) died from an undisclosed protracted illness. INEC set the by-election date for 26 February alongside five other by-elections. The seat was held for the PDP by Effiom Ekeng Edet who defeated his nearest opponent, the APC's Bassey Effiom, by 503 votes.
 Ekiti State
 Ekiti East I State Constituency: On January 31, 2021, member for Ekiti East I Juwa Adegbuyi (APC) died from an undisclosed illness. INEC originally set the date for the by-election for 20 March 2021; however, on the by-election date, multiple reports of violence and ballot snatching including the murder of 3 people at a polling station led INEC to suspend and postpone the by-election indefinitely. 
 Imo State
 Ngor Okpala State Constituency: On 26 October 2021, the seat of Ngor Okpala was declared vacant by Speaker Kennedy Ibeh after member Tochi Okere (PDP) did not attend the constitutionally-required amount of legislative meetings. INEC set the by-election date for 26 February alongside five other by-elections.
 Kaduna State
 Giwa West State Constituency: On 15 December 2021, the member for Giwa West, Rilwanu Aminu Gadagau (APC), was killed in a bandit attack along the Kaduna-Zaria highway.
 Plateau State
 Pankshin South State Constituency: On 28 November 2021, member for Pankshin South, Henry Longs (APC), died from complications during a leg operation. INEC set the by-election date for 26 February alongside five other by-elections. The seat was held for the APC by Ezra Dakup who defeated his nearest opponent, Peter Da'an Dasat of the PDP, by 113 votes.
 Zamfara State
 Gusau East State Constituency: On 29 January 2022, the member for Gusau East, Ibrahim Na’iddah, died from a "protracted illness."
 Shinkafi State Constituency: On 29 June 2021, the member for Shinkafi, Muhammad Ahmad (APC), was killed in a bandit attack along the Sheme-Funtua highway in Katsina State.

Local elections
At least ten statewide local elections will be orhave been held in 2022:
 Adamawa: The Adamawa State Independent Electoral Commission held local elections on 9 April. The PDP won all 21 chairmanships and 226 councillorship seats.
 Benue: The Benue State Independent Electoral Commission initially called local elections for 7 May; however, the Commission later pushed the elections forward to 30 April. The PDP won all 23 chairmanships and 276 councillorship seats.
 Ebonyi: The Ebonyi State Independent Electoral Commission held local elections on 30 July. The APC won all 13 chairmanships and 171 councillorship seats.
 Edo: The Edo State Independent Electoral Commission initially called local elections for 19 April; however, a court ruled against the conduct of the elections and the EDSIEC postponed the election.
 Enugu: The Enugu State Independent Electoral Commission held local elections on 23 February. The PDP won all 17 chairmanships and 260 councillorship seats.
 Federal Capital Territory: The federal Independent National Electoral Commission held FCT local elections on 12 February. Of the six area council chairmanships, three went to the APC and PDP each while of the 62 councillorships, 44 went to the PDP and 18 were won by the APC.
 Imo: The Imo State Independent Electoral Commission called local elections for 12 March. However, this date was pushed back to 25 March before being suspended indefinitely due to security concerns.
 Katsina: The Katsina State Independent Electoral Commission held local elections on 11 April. Initial results showed the APC won all 31 declared chairmanships and 328 declared councillorship seats but results from three LGA were unavailable.
 Kebbi: The Kebbi State Independent Electoral Commission held local elections on 5 February. The APC won all 21 chairmanship and 225 councillorship seats.
 Osun: The Osun State Independent Electoral Commission called local elections for 15 October.

Notes

References

 
2022 in Nigeria